Mark Fraizer (born April 18, 1988) is an American politician who was the Ohio state representative in Ohio's 71st district. He took the seat after Scott Ryan left to join Mike DeWine's administration.

He ran for reelection in 2022 for District 68, but was defeated in the Republican primary by businessman Thaddeus Claggett.

References

Living people
Republican Party members of the Ohio House of Representatives
21st-century American politicians
1988 births
People from Newark, Ohio
Otterbein University alumni